The Kaiwhata River is a river of the southern North Island of New Zealand.

See also
List of rivers of New Zealand
List of rivers of Wellington Region

References

Rivers of the Wellington Region
Rivers of New Zealand